Ivabradine, sold under the brand name Procoralan among others, is a medication, which is a pacemaker current (If) inhibitor, used for the symptomatic management of heart-related chest pain and heart failure. Patients who qualify for use of Ivabradine for coronary heart failure are patients who have symptomatic heart failure, with reduced ejection volume, and heart rate at least 70 bpm, and the condition not able to be fully managed by beta blockers.

Ivabradine acts by allowing negative chronotropy in the sinoatrial structure thus reducing the heart rate via specific inhibition of the pacemaker current, a mechanism different from that of beta blockers and calcium channel blockers, two commonly prescribed antianginal classes of cardiac pharmaceuticals. Ivabradine has no apparent inotropic properties and may be a cardiotonic agent.

Medical uses
It is used for the symptomatic treatment of chronic stable angina pectoris in patients with normal sinus rhythm who cannot take beta blockers. It is also being used off-label in the treatment of inappropriate sinus tachycardia. Ivabradine stands as a pharmacological option for controlling HR and rhythm without associated side effects in postoperative CABG patients with IST

Chest pain
It may be as effective as the beta blocker atenolol and comparable with amlodipine in the management of chronic stable angina.

Heart failure
It is used in combination with beta blockers in people with heart failure with LVEF lower than 35 percent inadequately controlled by beta blockers alone and whose heart rate exceeds 70 beats per minute. In people not sufficiently managed with beta blockers for their heart failure adding ivabradine decreases the risk of hospitalization for heart failure.

Tachycardia
The clinical use of ivabradine is predicated on its mechanism of action on sinoatrial nodal tissue where it selectively inhibits the funny current (If) and results in a decrease in heart rate.

Ivabradine’s most frequent application in electrophysiology is for the treatment of inappropriate sinus tachycardia. Its use for inappropriate sinus tachycardia is not a European Medicines Agency/Food and Drug Administration–approved indication for ivabradine.

It has been used experimentally for the treatment of postural orthostatic tachycardia syndrome in patients with long COVID.

Contraindications
Ivabradine is contraindicated in sick sinus syndrome. It should also not be used concomitantly with potent inhibitors of CYP3A4, including azole antifungals (such as ketoconazole), macrolide antibiotics, nefazodone and the antiretroviral drugs nelfinavir and ritonavir.

Use of ivabradine with verapamil or diltiazem is contraindicated.

Adverse effects
Overall, 14.5% of patients taking ivabradine experience luminous phenomena (by patients described as sensations of enhanced brightness in a fully maintained visual field). This is probably due to blockage of Ih ion channels in the retina, which are very similar to cardiac If. These symptoms are mild, transient, and fully reversible. In clinical studies, about 1% of all patients had to discontinue the drug because of these sensations, which occurred on average 40 days after the drug was started.

In a large clinical trial, bradycardia (unusually slow heart rate) occurred in 2% and 5% of patients taking ivabradine at doses of 7.5 and 10 mg respectively (compared to 4.3% in those taking atenolol). 2.6–4.8% reported headaches. Other common adverse drug reactions (1–10% of patients) include first-degree AV block, ventricular extrasystoles, dizziness and/or blurred vision.

Mechanism of action
Ivabradine acts on the If (f is for "funny", so called because it had unusual properties compared with other current systems known at the time of its discovery) ion current, which is highly expressed in the sinoatrial node. If is a mixed Na+–K+ inward current activated by hyperpolarization and modulated by the autonomic nervous system. It is one of the most important ionic currents for regulating pacemaker activity in the sinoatrial (SA) node. Ivabradine selectively inhibits the pacemaker If current in a dose-dependent manner. Blocking this channel reduces cardiac pacemaker activity, selectively slowing the heart rate and allowing more time for blood to flow to the myocardium.  By inhibiting the If channel, Ivabradine reduces the heart rate and workload on the heart.  This is relevant in the usage of the medication to treat angina as well as congestive heart failure. This is in contrast to other commonly used rate-reducing medications, such as beta-blockers and calcium channel blockers, which not only reduce heart rate, but also the cardiac contractility. Given the selective decrease in rate without loss of contractility, ivabradine may prove efficacious for treatment of congestive heart failure with reduced ejection fraction.

Ivabradine binds to HCN4 receptors (Potassium/sodium hyperpolarization-activated cyclic nucleotide-gated channel 4), utilizing Y506, F509 and I510 residues.

Clinical trials

Coronary artery disease
The BEAUTIFUL study randomised over 10917 patients having stable coronary artery disease and left ventricle dysfunction (ejection fraction < 40%). Ivabradine did not show a significant reduction in the primary composite endpoint of cardiovascular death, admission to hospital for acute myocardial infarction, and admission to hospital for new onset or worsening heart failure. However, in a prespecified subgroup of patients with a heart rate of more than 70 bpm, ivabradine significantly reduced the following secondary endpoints:
 Coronary events by 22% (P=0.023)
 Fatal and nonfatal myocardial infarction by 36% (P=0.001)
 Coronary revascularization by 30% (P=0.016).

The SIGNIFY trial randomized 19,102 patients with coronary artery disease and a heart rate greater than 70, but without clinical heart failure to ivabradine or placebo in addition to standard therapy. Ivabradine did not improve outcomes in this patient group.

Chronic heart failure
In the SHIFT study, ivabradine significantly reduced the risk of the primary composite endpoint of hospitalization for worsening heart failure or cardiovascular death by 18% (P<0.0001) compared with placebo on top of optimal therapy. These benefits were observed after 3 months of treatment.
SHIFT also showed that administration of ivabradine to heart failure patients significantly reduced the risk of death from heart failure by 26% (P=0.014) and hospitalization for heart failure by 26% (P<0.0001).
The improvements in outcomes were observed throughout all prespecified subgroups: female and male, with or without beta-blockers at randomization, patients below and over 65 years of age, with heart failure of ischemic or non-ischemic etiology, NYHA class II or class III, IV, with or without diabetes, and with or without hypertension. A 2020 Cochrane review found no difference in cardiovascular mortality and serious adverse events between long-term treatment with ivabradine and placebo/usual care/no treatment in participants with heart failure with a reduced ejection fraction.

A note of caution must be emphasised. Ivabradine, though indicated for chronic heart failure in patients who are clinically stable, is not indicated in acute heart failure where the enhanced heart rate represents cardiac reserve. Indiscriminate use of Ivabradine could destabilise these patients.

Society and culture

Approval
Ivabradine was approved by the European Medicines Agency in 2005, and by the United States Food and Drug Administration in 2015.

Names
It is marketed by Amgen under the trade name Corlanor in the United States, and by Servier in the rest of the world under the trade names Procoralan (worldwide), Coralan (in Hong Kong, Singapore, Australia and some other countries), Corlentor (in Armenia, Spain, Italy and Romania), Lancora (in Canada) and Coraxan (in Russia and Serbia). It is also marketed in India under the brand names Ivabrad, Ivabid. In iran it's sold under the trademark of "bradix" . IVAMAC and Bradia. During its development, ivabradine was known as S-16257.

References

External links 

 
 

Antianginals
Benzocyclobutenes
Laboratoires Servier
Phenol ethers
Benzazepanes
Lactams
Tertiary amines